Robert A. Pickett (February 22, 1932 – February 3, 2010) was an American football player and coach who served as the head football coach of at the University of Massachusetts Amherst from 1978 to 1983.

Early life
Pickett attended high school at Cony High School in Augusta, Maine, where he graduated in 1952. He attended Maine Central Institute for one year after that, and then finished his education at the University of Maine where he graduated in 1959. Pickett played football for Maine and was their starting quarterback.

Coaching career
Pickett began his coaching career after coaching as the head football and basketball coach at Laconia High School. In his first season, Laconia won the Division II state title, their second ever championship and their first since 1951. He  coached at Portsmouth High School from 1962 until 1964, when he became an assistant coach at Maine.   In 1971 he joined Dick MacPherson as the defensive coordinator at the University of Massachusetts Amherst. He was promoted to head coach following MacPherson's departure in 1978. In his first season as head coach, UMASS won the Yankee Conference championship and was runner-up finish in the NCAA Division I-AA Football Championship. He served as head coach until 1983, compiling a record of 36–28 overall record and winning four Yankee Conference championships.

Later life
Pickett served as UMASS' associate athletic director until his retirement in 1997. He then as a color commentator on radio broadcasts of Minutemen football from 1998 to 2003.

Head coaching record

College

References

1932 births
2010 deaths
American football quarterbacks
Maine Black Bears football coaches
Maine Black Bears football players
UMass Minutemen football coaches
High school football coaches in New Hampshire
Maine Central Institute alumni
Sportspeople from Augusta, Maine
Coaches of American football from Maine
Players of American football from Maine